The 1983 Cronulla-Sutherland Sharks season was the seventeenth in the club's history. Coached by Terry Fearnley and captained by Gavin Miller, they competed in the NSWRFL's 1983 Winfield Cup premiership. Finishing the regular season 9th (out of 14), the Sharks failed to reach the finals for the second consecutive year. The club also competed in the 1983 KB Cup, in which they reached the final.

Miller was the only Sharks player selected for representative football this season, playing for New South Wales in the 1983 State of Origin series.

Ladder

References

Cronulla-Sutherland Sharks seasons
Cronulla-Sutherland Sharks season